The 2023 season is Sport Club Internacional's 113th season in existence. As well as the Campeonato Brasileiro Série A, the club competes in the Copa do Brasil, the Campeonato Gaúcho and the Copa Libertadores.

First team

Transfers

In

Out

Loans in

Loans Out

Competitions

Overview

Campeonato Gaúcho

League table

Matches

Knockout stage

Semi-finals

Copa Libertadores 

Internacional has qualified for the 2023 Libertadores group stage, which will be drawn by CONMEBOL on 27 March 2023.

Serie A

Results summary

Matches 

The league fixtures were announced on 14 February 2023.

Copa do Brasil 

Internacional will automatically be drawn in the Third Round of the Copa do Brasil, which is scheduled to be played in April, due to its participation in this year's Copa Libertadores.

Statistics

Goalscorers 
*Only players that played at least one match in the season

**Parenthesis denote matches where the players played as a sub

References

External links 
 

 
Sport Club Internacional seasons
2023 in Brazilian football